The list below shows the leading jump sire of racehorses in Great Britain and Ireland for each jump season since 1988–89. This is determined by the amount of prize money won by the sire's progeny during the season.

 1975–76 – Menelek
 1976–77 – Master Owen
 1977–78 – Master Owen
 1978–79 – Spartan General
 1979–80 – Deep Run
 1980–81 – Deep Run
 1981–82 – Deep Run
 1982–83 – Deep Run
 1983–84 – Deep Run
 1984–85 – Deep Run
 1985–86 – Deep Run
 1986–87 – Deep Run
 1987–88 – Deep Run
 1988–89 – Deep Run
 1989–90 – Deep Run
 1990–91 – Deep Run
 1991–92 – Deep Run
 1992–93 – Deep Run
 1993–94 – Strong Gale
 1994–95 – Strong Gale 
 1995–96 – Strong Gale
 1996–97 – Strong Gale
 1997–98 – Strong Gale
 1998–99 – Strong Gale
 1999–00 – Be My Native
 2000–01 – Be My Native
 2001–02 – Be My Native
 2002–03 – Be My Native
 2003–04 – Be My Native
 2004–05 – Supreme Leader
 2005–06 – Supreme Leader
 2006–07 – Presenting
 2007–08 – Old Vic
 2008–09 – Presenting
 2009–10 – Presenting
 2010–11 – Presenting
 2011–12 – King's Theatre
 2012–13 – Beneficial
 2013–14 – King's Theatre
 2014–15 – King's Theatre
 2015–16 – King's Theatre
 2016–17 – King's Theatre
 2017–18 – Flemensfirth 
 2018–19 – Flemensfirth 
 2019–20 – Milan

References 

 www.racingpost.com

See also
 Leading sire in Great Britain & Ireland
 Leading broodmare sire in Great Britain & Ireland

Horse racing in Great Britain
Horse racing in Ireland